Mani Suresh Kumar (19 April 1973 – 9 October 2020) was an Indian first-class cricketer who played for Kerala in the Ranji Trophy. He was born in Alleppey, Kerala, India. Kumar has also played for India U-19 under the captaincy of Rahul Dravid against New Zealand U-19 in 1992.

Mani was a left-hand batsman and slow left-arm orthodox bowler. He took a hat-trick in the 1995-96 Ranji Trophy playing for Kerala against Rajasthan.

M. Suresh Kumar committed suicide by hanging on 9 October 2020 in Alappuzha.

Teams
Ranji Trophy: Kerala, Railways
India U-19 cricket team
South Zone cricket team

See also
 List of hat-tricks in the Ranji Trophy

References 

Kerala cricketers
Railways cricketers
1973 births
Suicides by hanging in India
2020 deaths
2020 suicides
Sportspeople from Alappuzha